"Lover to Lover" is a song by English indie rock band Florence and the Machine. The song was released on 30 November 2012, as a digital download on iTunes as the fifth and final single from their second studio album Ceremonials (2011). The song was written by Florence Welch and Francis "Eg" White and produced by Paul Epworth. The Ceremonials Tour version of "Lover to Lover" is an edited version of the original with further production by Chris Hayden. The song became the band's first single to miss the top 200 in the UK Singles Chart.

Critical reception
"Lover to Lover" received acclaim from music critics. In a review of Ceremonials, Allison Fitts of Dart News Online praised the song, calling it "one of the most unique [songs] on Ceremonials" and saying, "'Lover to Lover' is basically what the band would have sounded like 50 years ago", and compared it to the works of Fitz & the Tantrums. American magazines Rolling Stone and Billboard, in their reviews of the album, compared the song to the work of Adele.

Music video
A music video to accompany the release of Lover to Lover was first released onto YouTube on 19 November 2012 at a total length of four minutes and twenty seconds. The video stars Welch alongside Australian actor Ben Mendelsohn and was directed by Vincent Haycock, who previously worked with the band when he directed the music video for Calvin Harris's single, "Sweet Nothing."

Charts

Release history

References

2012 singles
Florence and the Machine songs
Songs written by Florence Welch
2011 songs
Songs written by Eg White
Island Records singles
Song recordings produced by Paul Epworth